Strmo Rebro is a small settlement in the hills above the right bank of the Sava River, northwest of Gora in the Municipality of Krško in eastern Slovenia. The area is part of the traditional region of Lower Carniola. It is now included with the rest of the municipality in the Lower Sava Statistical Region.

References

External links
Strmo Rebro on Geopedia

Populated places in the Municipality of Krško